Griffith Review is a quarterly publication featuring essays, reportage, memoir, fiction, poetry and artwork from established and emerging writers and artists. Each edition focuses on a contemporary theme, enabling pertinent issues to be aired and discussed in a public forum. The publication was founded in 2003. It was founded and developed by Griffith University in Australia, and initially published by ABC Books. In 2009, Text Publishing became the Review's publishing partner and distributor. Therefore, the magazine has bases in both Brisbane and Melbourne. Julianne Schultz was the founding editor and has been publisher since 2018, when Ashley Hay was appointed editor.

Awards 
 2007 Victorian Premier's Literary Award - Alfred Deakin Prize for an Essay Advancing Public Debate was awarded to Frank Moorhouse for "The Writer in a time of terror", published in Griffith Review 14: The Trouble With Paradise
 2007 Walkley Award for Excellence in Journalism 
 Finalist for the Magazine Feature Writing category - Margaret Simons for her essay "Buried in the labyrinth", published in Griffith Review 16: Unintended Consequences
 Winner for the Social Equity Journalism category - Frank Moorhouse for "The writer in a time of terror" 
 2013 Walkley Award for Excellence in Journalism 
 Winner for the Coverage of Indigenous Affairs category - Kathy Marks for her reportage piece "Channelling Mannalargenna", published in Griffith Review 39: Tasmania – The Tipping Point?
 Winner for the Long Feature Writing category - Melissa Lucashenko for her reportage piece "Sinking below sight", published in Griffith Review 41: Now We Are Ten
2014 Human Rights Awards - journalist and editor Peter Mares was shortlisted for the Print and Online Award for his piece "Refuge without work", published in Griffith Review 45: The Way We Work.

See also
List of literary magazines

References

External links
 Griffith Review website

2003 establishments in Australia
Griffith University
Literary magazines published in Australia
Magazines established in 2003
Magazines published in Melbourne
Mass media in Brisbane
Quarterly magazines published in Australia